HMS Robust was a 74-gun third-rate ship of the line of the Royal Navy, built by John Barnard and launched on 25 October 1764 at Harwich. She was the first vessel of the Royal Navy to bear the name.

Service history

In 1778 she was at the Battle of Ushant in Palliser's division of the fleet. Her captain, Alexander Hood, took Palliser's side in the subsequent court martial known as "the Keppel affair".

Robust was part of the fleet under Lord Hood that occupied Toulon in August 1793. Once the forts were secure, the remainder of Hood's fleet, accompanied by 17 Spanish ships-of-the-line which had just arrived, sailed into the harbour.

On 12 October 1798 she captured the French ship Hoche while under the command of Sir John Warren at the Battle of Tory Island.

On 21 July 1801, the boats of Robust,  and  succeeded in boarding and cutting out the French naval corvette Chevrette, which was armed with 20 guns and had 350 men on board (crew and troops placed on board in expectation of the attack). Also, Chevrette was under the batteries of Bay of Cameret. The hired armed cutter  placed herself in the Goulet and thereby prevented the French from bringing reinforcements by boat to Chevrette.

The action was a sanguinary one. The British lost 11 men killed, 57 wounded, and one missing; Chevrette lost 92 officers, seamen and troops killed, including her first captain, and 62 seamen and troops wounded. In 1847 the Admiralty awarded the Naval General Service Medal with clasp "21 JULY BOAT SERVICE 1801" to surviving claimants from the action.

Fate
Robust was employed on harbour service from 1812, and was broken up in 1817.

Notes

Citations

References
 
 Lavery, Brian (2003) The Ship of the Line - Volume 1: The development of the battlefleet 1650-1850. Conway Maritime Press. .

External links
 

Ships of the line of the Royal Navy
Ramillies-class ships of the line
1764 ships
Ships built in Harwich